Saint Tydfil (Welsh: Tudful; martyred ) is the legendary dedicatee of Merthyr Tydfil, Wales. The old parish church of St Tydfil, Merthyr Tydfil is dedicated to her and is reputed to be the site of her death.

According to legend, Tydfil was the twenty-third daughter of Brychan, king of Brycheiniog, by his fourth wife. She was murdered with her brother Rhun in Merthyr Tydfil, by either Welsh or Saxon pagans and buried in the town, it’s theorised that it could have been pagans from the Llanelli area as there’s evidence there was a pagan worship ground there. No trace remains of her holy well Ffynnon Dydfil, which is thought to have been near the southern end of Well Street in Merthyr Tydfil. The daughter church of St Tydfil's Well is in the area of Merthyr Tydfil known as 'The Quar' (quarry). 

Llysworney Church in the Vale of Glamorgan is dedicated to this female saint, as was a chapel in Llantwit Major until it was given to the Abbey of Tewkesbury.

References

Late Ancient Christian female saints
5th-century women
Welsh princesses
5th-century Christian saints
5th-century Christian martyrs
Children of Brychan
Female saints of medieval Wales
People from Powys
Year of birth unknown
5th-century Welsh people